Evgeny Evgenyevich Stalev (born , Lytkarino) is a Russian professional player of Russian billiards and nine-ball. He was the 2000 world champion and 2003 Asian champion in Russian billiards.

Titles
 2003 Russian Pyramid Asian Championship
 2000 WPA World Pyramid Championship
 1999 WPA World Pyramid Championship
 1998 Euro Tour Spain Open
 1996 Polish Pool Championship 9-Ball
 1995 Polish Pool Championship 9-Ball

References 

1979 births
Living people
People from Moscow Oblast
Russian pool players
Sportspeople from Moscow Oblast